The year 1862 in science and technology involved some significant events, listed below.

Astronomy
 January 31 – Alvan Graham Clark makes the first observation of Sirius B, a white dwarf star, through an eighteen-inch telescope at Northwestern University in Illinois.

Biology
 May 15 – Charles Darwin publishes On the various contrivances by which British and foreign Orchids are fertilised by insects, and on the good effects of intercrossing.
 Henry Walter Bates publishes "Contributions to an insect fauna of the Amazon valley. Lepidoptera: Heliconidae" describing Batesian mimicry.
 George Bentham and Joseph Dalton Hooker begin publication of Genera plantarum based on the collections of the Royal Botanic Gardens, Kew, England.
 John Gwyn Jeffreys begins publication of British Conchology, or an account of the Mollusca which now inhabit the British Isles and the surrounding seas.

Chemistry
 Chemist and composer Alexander Borodin describes the first nucleophilic displacement of chlorine by fluorine in benzoyl chloride.
 Mineralogist Alexandre-Emile Béguyer de Chancourtois makes the first proposal to arrange the chemical elements in order of atomic weights, although this is largely ignored by chemists.
 Alexander Parkes exhibits Parkesine, one of the earliest synthetic polymers, at the International Exhibition in London. This discovery forms the foundation of the modern plastics industry.

Earth sciences
 Friedrich Albert Fallou publishes "Pedologie oder allgemeine und besondere Bodenkunde" (Pedology or general and special soil science), founding soil science.

Medicine
 Maurice Raynaud describes the vasospastic syndrome named after him in his doctoral dissertation.
 Hermann Snellen publishes the Snellen chart for testing visual acuity.

Technology
 July 8 – Theodore Timby is granted a United States patent for discharging guns in a revolving turret, using electricity.
 November 4 – Richard Jordan Gatling is granted a United States patent for the Gatling gun.
 Brown & Sharpe produce the first Universal Milling machine.
 David Kirkaldy publishes Results of an Experimental Inquiry into the Comparative Tensile Strength and other properties of various kinds of Wrought-Iron and Steel in Glasgow describing his pioneering work in tensile testing.

Awards
 Copley Medal: Thomas Graham
 Wollaston Medal for geology: Robert Godwin-Austen

Births
 January 23 – David Hilbert (died 1943), German mathematician
 February 14 – Agnes Pockels (died 1935), German chemist (in Venice)
 March 14 – Vilhelm Bjerknes (died 1951), Norwegian physicist and meteorologist
 May 27 – John Edward Campbell (died 1924), Irish-born mathematician
 June 7 – Philipp Lenard (died 1947), German physicist
 June 9 – Ernest William Moir (died 1933), British civil engineer
 July 2 – William Henry Bragg (died 1942), English winner of the 1915 Nobel Prize in Physics
 August 2 – Paul Bujor (died 1952), Romanian animal morphologist, politician and short story writer
 October 12 – Theodor Boveri (died 1915), German geneticist
 October 19 – Auguste Lumière (died 1954), French inventor, film pioneer
 November 23 - Ernest Guglielminetti (died 1943), Swiss physician
 William Hoskins (died 1934), American inventor

Deaths
 January 10 – Samuel Colt (born 1814), American inventor
 February 3 – Jean-Baptiste Biot (born 1774), French physicist
 February 7 – Prosper Ménière (born 1799), French physician who first described the symptoms of Ménière's disease
 February 11 – Luther V. Bell (born 1806), American psychiatric physician
 March 1 – Peter Barlow (born 1776), English mathematician
 April 3 – Sir James Clark Ross (born 1800), English explorer of the Polar regions
 May 6 – Olry Terquem (born 1782), French Jewish geometer
 October 8 – James Walker (born 1781), Scottish-born civil engineer
 October 21 – Sir Benjamin Collins Brodie, 1st Baronet (born 1783), English physiologist
 December 18 – Lucas Barrett (born 1837), English naturalist (drowned)
 December 20 – Robert Knox (born 1791), Scottish anatomist
 December 21 – Karl Kreil (born 1798), Austrian astronomer

References

 
Science, 1862 In
1860s in science
19th century in science